Sir Kim Martin Jordan Lewison, PC (born 1 May 1952) is a Lord Justice of Appeal. He is a graduate of Downing College, Cambridge, where he is an honorary Fellow.

Early life and education

Lewison was born on 1 May 1952 to Anthony Frederick Lewison and Dinora Lewison (née Pines). He was educated at St Paul's School, an all-boys private school in London. He studied at Downing College, Cambridge.

Legal career

Lewison was called to the bar (Lincoln's Inn) in 1975 and has been a Bencher since 2003. He became a Queen's Counsel in 1991. He was appointed an Assistant Recorder in 1994 and a Recorder in 1997. In 2000, he was appointed a Deputy High Court Judge. He was appointed to the High Court of Justice on 29 April 2003 and assigned to the Chancery Division, receiving the customary knighthood.

The following year, he was appointed to the Competition Appeal Tribunal. Lewison served as Chancery Supervising Judge from 2007 to 2009. On 3 October 2011, he was appointed a Lord Justice of Appeal, and received the customary appointment to the Privy Council.

References

1952 births
Living people
21st-century English judges
Chancery Division judges
Knights Bachelor
Members of the Privy Council of the United Kingdom
Alumni of Downing College, Cambridge
Lords Justices of Appeal
People educated at St Paul's School, London
20th-century King's Counsel
20th-century English judges